Al-Shihr District is a district of the Hadhramaut Governorate, Yemen. The district had a population of 73,482 people as of 2012, and possibly 101,975 by 2015 numbers.

Geography
The district contains  hills such as Khashm ‘Urf, Khashm Khuwayr, Duqm al Muḩawwal, Khashm al Muḩawwal, Ra's Ḩawrā', ‘Aqabat al ‘Arshah and ‘Aqabat Ma‘dī. Wadis in the district include Shi‘b Ruş‘ah, Wādī ‘Arf, Wādī ‘Ārif, Wādī al Ghalāghil, Wādī al Qibālī, Wādī Disabah, Wādī Ghanam, Wādī Ḩaqab, Wādī Ma‘dī and Wādī Şayq.

Notes

References 

Districts of Hadhramaut Governorate